Pariyerum Perumal is a 2018 Indian Tamil-language drama film, directed by Mari Selvaraj in his directorial debut and produced by Pa. Ranjith under his production banner Neelam Productions. The film stars Kathir and Anandhi in the leading roles, while Yogi Babu and G. Marimuthu appear in supporting roles. The film features music composed by Santhosh Narayanan. with cinematography handled by Sridhar and editing done by Selva R. K.

It follows Pariyan (Kathir), a youngster who belongs to an oppressed caste and enters into law college with a lot of hope, and strikes up a friendship with Jothi Mahalakshmi (Anandhi), who belongs to an upper caste, which irks Jothi's family members. He wakes up to the realities of caste oppression and discrimination, after being harassed by them. Director Selvaraj, who wrote short stories for Ananda Vikatan in the past, was approached by Ranjith after reading some of his works. Ranjith who is impressed with the script, decided to produce the film. The film's principal shoot took place in Tirunelveli and Thoothukudi, since the film depicts the lives of the people in the region.

Pariyerum Perumal released on 28 September 2018, and received critical acclaim, with critics praised the technical aspects, direction, screenplay, performance of the film's cast, especially Kathir's performance. The film received four Ananda Vikatan Cinema Awards, including Best Story and Best Director for Selvaraj, six nominations at the 8th SIIMA Awards, receiving two wins, four nominations at the 66th Filmfare Awards South, receiving an award for Best Film. The film was honoured at the Touluse Indian Film Festival and the 16th Chennai International Film Festival, receiving an award for the best feature, and was also screened at the 49th International Film Festival of India.

Plot 
Pariyerum Perumal narrates the story of a youth hailing from Puliyankulam village near Tirunelveli. Pariyerum Perumal alias Pariyan  belongs to an oppressed caste. The movie begins with the brutal murder of his beloved black dog 'Karuppi’ (lit. Blackie in Tamil). The canine hunting companion of Pariyan is the first one we see becoming a victim of caste hegemony.

Pariyan moves on to secure a seat in Government Law College, Tirunelveli where he wishes to become a lawyer like B. R. Ambedkar. He meets Jothi Mahalakshmi alias Jo, a naive girl from Ambasamudram who takes it upon herself to teach English to Pariyan. She eventually falls for his innocence and honesty. This newfound friendship irks Sankaralingam, a fellow law student and Jo's cousin. He awaits a chance to teach a lesson to Pariyan and establish his caste superiority. He does so while the blissfully unaware Jo invites Pariyan to a family wedding.

In another part of town, an old man is seen engineering unique and cunning methods to kill innocent people, for example, strangling a young girl then hanging her and drowning a student in the river. At the wedding that he was invited to, Pariyan is almost beaten to death by Sankaralingam and his fellows, and they also urinate on him. It was stopped, and Pariyan was warned by Jo's father, who asked Pariyan to stay out of Jo's life. Jo, unaware of all this, yells at Pariyan the next day for not attending her sister's marriage as she had invited only him in the whole college. Pariyan's answers made Jo cry and have a fight with him.

Pariyan, who becomes upset the next day, drinks alcohol and attends the class, which leads him to the principal's (Poo Ram) room. He is asked to bring his father, so he bribes a person to be his father, and the man does the job successfully. Another day, Pariyan's teacher tries to solve the problem between Pariyan and Jo, but Pariyan points out that Jo gave an invitation-only to him, making it clear that he treats her only as his friend, which infuriates her. The very same day as he sits in Sankaralingam's bench, the latter gets infuriated, pushes Pariyan into the ladies' toilet, and locks the door, which once again leads Pariyan to the principal's room. Pariyan is again asked to bring his father. This time, he brings his real father, who is a folk dancer who dances in drag clothing.

The principal understands Pariyan's innocence and asks him to be bold and continue to fight like this. As Pariyan comes out of the principal's room, he finds his father brutally ragged by Sankaralingam and his fellow mates, and they pull Pariyan's father's dhoti. Pariyan's father runs out of college half-naked, followed by Sankaralingam and his group, and Pariyan runs after them. Pariya takes his father to a hospital to get him treatment. Meanwhile, Jo's father realizes that his daughter is madly in love with Pariyan. Fearing humiliation and ostracization from his caste if his daughter elopes with someone from a lower caste, he hires the old man("Thatha Maistry"). It is then revealed that Thatha Maistry is an assassin who murders people to protect the  honour of the people of his caste. Thatha reveals that he looks at his work as a divine ordinance and promises that the day that he is unsuccessful, he will kill himself.

Thatha and Pariyan know each other, and Thatha even offers to fix the problem by talking to Pariyan. Pariyan, who is by his father's bedside at the hospital, contemplates taking revenge, but his mother asks him not to do so. She reminds him that humiliation and oppression is something that they have dealt with their whole life and that violence won't fix anything. He is informed that Jo is waiting in the hospital for him. An emotional Jo makes Pariyan realize how important he is for her, and though she loves him, she asks him to be the same old Pariyan, who was very friendly with her. Pariyan makes a promise to be like that.

The old man asks for a lift in Pariyan's cycle and tries to kill him. The old man then puts Pariyan on a railway track to kill him in the same way that Karuppi was killed, but Pariyan wakes up and escapes, which leads to a heavy fight between the old man and Pariyan. Pariyan realizes that he was sent by Jo's father and Sankaralingam. He beats Sankaralingam and others brutally. He then says to Jo's father that the life he is living is a gift given by Pariyan because if Jo becomes aware of the activities of her father, she will not spare him. He asks him to leave him and goes. The old man, who realizes that he has failed in his attempt to kill his mark for the first time, commits suicide on the railway track.

Jo, who remains completely oblivious to the violence around her,  brings her father to meet Pariyan, and as she goes to buy tea for them, Jo's father asks for an apology for his mistake. He speaks to Pariyan well and then says, "We can see. We do not know what will happen in the future," to which Pariyan replies, "As long as you remain the same and expect me to remain a dog, nothing will change".

Cast 

Kathir as Pariyerum Perumal (Pariyan)
Anandhi as Jothi Mahalakshmi (Jo)
Yogi Babu as Anand
Lijeesh as Sankaralingam
Vannarpettai Thangaraj as Pariyan's father
G. Marimuthu as Jo's father
Shanmugarajan as Pariyan's false father
Karate Venkatesan as 'Thatha' Maistry
Lizzie Antony as College Professor
Suganthi Nachchiyal as College Professor
Poo Ram as College Principal
Hari Krishnan as Pariyan's senior
Supergood Subramani in a special appearance ("Naan Yaar")
Anthony Daasan in a special appearance ("Engum Pugazh Thuvanga")

Production

Development 
Pa. Ranjith registered his maiden film production company, Neelam Productions in late October 2016. Although the company had produced two documentary films, the director announced his debut as a film producer, with his association with Mari Selvaraj, a former assistant of Ram, in his directorial debut, titled Pariyerum Perumal, which became official in December 2016. Ranjith approached Selvaraj after reading his works like 'Thamirabaraniyil Kaapatrapattavargal' a short story and 'Marakavae Ninaikiren' a fictional series in Ananda Vikatan, and also decided to produce the film, after he narrated the script to the latter. Ranjith selected actors Kathir and Anandhi, to play the leading roles, while his regular collaborator Santhosh Narayanan, Sridhar, Selva R. K. and Ramu joined the team as music composer, cinematographer, editor and art director respectively. The film's other principal cast involves Yogi Babu and G. Marimuthu.

Filming 
Principal photography commenced in January 2017, with Tirunelveli and Thoothukudi regions served as the principal shoot. It was reported that the film may depict the lives of the people in the region. Regarding the title of the film, Mari Selvaraj, stated "Pariyerum Perumal is a local deity who is worshipped in southern Tamil Nadu. The film's protagonist Kathir, was essayed to play the titular character, a youngster who enters law college with a lot of hope and wakes up to the realities. Anandhi was essayed to play the role of his love interest, Jothi Mahalakshmi, where the main track of the film revolves, and her role was inspired from the characterisation of Shweta Tripathi in Masaan (2015)." Mari Selvaraj also revealed about the cross-breed dog, "Karuppi" another main character, which has the traits of Chippiparai, stating that "The dog has been considered as the film's soul, which the film incidentally starts and ends with her travel." The film's shooting was completed in March 2018.

Music 

Pa. Ranjith's norm composer Santhosh Narayanan, was assigned to composed the music and background score of Pariyerum Perumal. Santhosh took the project as a mix of folk and conventional music, which is very much prevalent in the southern region of Tamil Nadu, where most of the native singers recorded the album. The songs reflect the theme of the film. The first single "Karuppi En Karuppi" which released on 4 March 2018, was showcased on the life of the dog, who has been killed in caste-breed clashes. Santhosh, the performer of the song, also slated that "the song is dedicated to the lives of innocent little souls that do not know why they’re being killed all over the world." The song "Vaa Rayil Vida Polaamaa" was sung by Super Singer Junior 5 title winner Prithika. The film's album was launched by Dhanush on 24 August 2018.

The album received mostly positive critical reception. Behindwoods gave a rating of 3 out of 5, and stated "The album is a perfect blend of folk, melody, rap and rock music, empowered by powerful moving lyrics." Indiaglitz gave the album 3.75 out of 5 and stated "Santhosh has efficiently churned out an album which has character, soul and hauntingly affecting." Milliblog reviewed as "After Kaala, Pariyerum Perumal is the second whopper from Santhosh Narayanan this year!" Moviecrow gave the album 4 out of 5 and summarised "The Santhosh Narayanan's soundtrack for Mari Selvaraj's directorial debut, 'Pariyerum Perumal' is more of an aural introduction and mood setup for us to know what to look forward in the film. The album seems stunningly story driven and has lyrics that are daringly different from anything we are used to hear in our songs so far."

Release 
The film's first promotional poster which released on 14 February 2018, featured a dog with a collar and leash around its neck in the foreground while the silhouettes of a number of people can be seen in the background. The film was originally slated to release in March 2018, but its release was postponed due to the standoff between Nadigar Sangam and Digital Service Providers on the increase of Virtual Print Fee charges. The first trailer of the film was unveiled in June 2018, and received rave response from all corners. The movie was released theatrically on 28 September 2018, after receiving a U certificate from the Central Board of Film Certification with no cuts but two mutes. Despite being released in 121 theatres, the film got limited screens, due to Mani Ratnam's mutli-starrer Chekka Chivantha Vaanam. However, after the positive response received by the audience, theatre owners increased the number of shows and screens. Many filmmakers and actors heaped praise among the film. The film opened to theatres across Karnataka on 12 October 2018, and in Kerala on 26 October 2018, following its positive critical acclaim. After its successful theatrical run, the movie was made available to stream on Amazon Prime Video on 12 November 2018. The film was screened at the inaugural New York Dalit Film and Cultural Festival in 2019 along with Masaan (2015), Kaala (2018) and Fandry (2013). Along with few other Tamil films, the movie was showcased at the 49th International Film Festival of India.

Reception

Critical reception 
Pariyerum Perumal received critical acclaim. Srinivasa Ramanujam of The Hindu wrote "With such strong statements to make against caste, the film could have easily adopted a dark theme but it prefers to stay hopeful. The climax is easily among its most touching moments. If there’s one film you’re watching this year, it has to be Pariyerum Perumal." M Suganth of The Times of India gave the film 4 out of 5 stars "Pariyerum Perumal is a hard-hitting anti-caste drama." Anupama Subramanian of Deccan Chronicle rated 4.5 out of 5 and then stated it as "Pariyerum Perumal is a film that goes beyond your expectations and should not be missed at any cost!" India Today gave the film 4 out of 5 stars and stated "Pariyerum Perumal is more depressing when you realise everything that pans out in this disturbing film has actually happened or is happening or will continue to happen in our country." The News Minute reviewed as It can be quite easy to bind a film under seals of approvals like ‘masterpiece’ and ‘milestone’. But there are few films that venture beyond the confines of such labels and Pariyerum Perumal is one such example. At a time when Tamil cinema is turning to look back at its portrayal of caste, more importantly, to rewrite its portrayals, Pariyerum Perumal can effortlessly be called its luminary." Baradwaj Rangan of Film Companion gave 3.5 out of 5 stars and stated "This film is a powerful, yet level-headed, drama about an oppressed youth carving out a place of his own."

Sify gave the rating 3.5 out of 5 and stated "Pariyerum Perumal is an artistic masterpiece from debutant filmmaker Mari Selvaraj and set the standards high for directors who have noble intentions but end up making preachy propaganda films." Cinema Express gave the film 4 out of 5 and stated "The subtexts are painfully brilliant in a film that doesnt paint the world black and white." Behindwoods gave the film 3 out of 5 and stated "Pariyerum Perumal is a well-made film that makes you think and hits you hard right in the soul! Watch it for the team's overall effort." Indiaglitz gave 2.5 out of 5 and added "Go for it to watch an outstanding performance by Kathir who deserves all the kudos for his dedication." Firstpost reviewed it as "Pariyerum Perumal is a great movie to watch. However, the movie is neither anti-caste nor casteist. Rather, it merely discusses popular forms of discrimination and evokes memories of some earlier instances of caste violence. The movie eventually tries to find solutions within the caste system itself." The Indian Express also reviewed as "Pariyerum Perumal shows it’s not easy to overcome the challenges of all-pervasive caste. But it may not be impossible either."

Box office 
The film collected  at the Chennai box office collection in the first opening weekend, however the positive word of mouth, pushed the film to collect  in the second week. The movie became a surprise hit at the box office.

Awards and nominations

Legacy 
The portrayal of the film's central character Karuppi, became popular among audiences. Inspired from the famous ‘Dogelore’ (which refers to the meme universe featuring dogs), the character was featured as the new addition. Some of the film's plot inspired the 2020 Telugu film Colour Photo.

References

External links 

Pariyerum Perumal Official YouTube channel

2010s Tamil-language films
2018 directorial debut films
2018 drama films
2018 films
Films about the caste system in India
Indian drama films